The 2010 NCAA Division I softball season, play of college softball in the United States organized by the National Collegiate Athletic Association (NCAA) at the Division I level, began in February 2010.  The season progressed through the regular season, many conference tournaments and championship series, and concluded with the 2010 NCAA Division I softball tournament and 2010 Women's College World Series.  The Women's College World Series, consisting of the eight remaining teams in the NCAA Tournament and held in Oklahoma City at ASA Hall of Fame Stadium, ended on June 7, 2010.

Conference standings

Women's College World Series
The 2010 NCAA Women's College World Series took place from June 3 to June 7, 2010 in Oklahoma City.

Season leaders
Batting
Batting average: .567 – Jen Yee, Georgia Tech Yellow Jackets
RBIs: 90 – Angeline Quiocho, BYU Cougars
Home runs: 30 – Kelly Majam, Hawaii Rainbow Wahine

Pitching
Wins: 40-5 – Danielle Lawrie, Washington Huskies
ERA: 0.94 (32 ER/237.0 IP) – Whitney Kiihnl, Lipscomb Bisons
Strikeouts: 556 – Sara Plourde, UMass Minutewomen

Records
NCAA Division I season SEASON slugging percentage:
1.270% – Jen Yee, Georgia Tech Yellow Jackets

NCAA Division I season intentional walks:
31 – Jen Yee, Georgia Tech Yellow Jackets

Sophomore class single game home runs:
4 – Rebecca Magett, Hampton Lady Pirates; April 2, 2010

Freshman class home runs:
30 – Kelly Majam, Hawaii Rainbow Wahine

Awards
USA Softball Collegiate Player of the Year:
Danielle Lawrie, Washington Huskies

Honda Sports Award Softball:
Danielle Lawrie, Washington Huskies

All America Teams
The following players were members of the All-American Teams.

First Team

Second Team

Third Team

References

External links